The Zemeic, Zeme, or Zeliangrong languages are a branch of Sino-Tibetan languages spoken mostly in Indian state of Nagaland, Assam and Manipur in northeast India. It may have close relationship with other Naga languages pending further research. The corresponding ethnic group is the Zeliangrong people. There were 63,529 Zeliang-speaking people in India in 2011.

Ethnologue gives the name Western Naga for the Zeme languages.

Languages

The Zemeic languages are:
Zeme
Liangmai
Rongmei
Mzieme (Northern Zeme)
Puiron
Khoirao (Thangal)
Maram

The Zeme and Rongmei language clusters are close enough to sometimes be considered dialects of a single Zeliang language.

Van Driem (2011) lists the varieties, from south to north, as:
Mzieme, Khoirao, Maram, Puiron, Zeme (also known as Empeo Naga, Kacha Naga, Kochu Naga), Nruanghmei (also known as Rongmei, Kabui), Liangmai (also known as Kwoireng)

(Inpui and Puimei, which are sometimes listed, are not distinct.)

References

 George van Driem (2001) Languages of the Himalayas: An Ethnolinguistic Handbook of the Greater Himalayan Region. Brill.

Languages of India